1st Duke of Buckingham  may refer to:

 George Villiers, 1st Duke of Buckingham (1592–1628), favourite of King James I of England
 Humphrey Stafford, 1st Duke of Buckingham (1402–1460), English nobleman
 John Sheffield, 1st Duke of Buckingham and Normanby (1647–1721), English poet
 Richard Temple-Grenville, 1st Duke of Buckingham and Chandos (1776–1839), Knight of the Garter